Janez Grbelja (born 2 December 1948) is a Croatian rower. He competed in the men's eight event at the 1972 Summer Olympics.

References

1948 births
Living people
Croatian male rowers
Olympic rowers of Yugoslavia
Rowers at the 1972 Summer Olympics
Sportspeople from Šibenik